Consumer NZ, previously known as Consumers' Institute of New Zealand, is an organization that covers a wide range of activities relating to consumer protection and information. Its work includes comparative tests and surveys of consumer goods and services, research into and advice on financial, food, health, safety, welfare and environmental matters, representation at parliamentary committees and public enquiries and interest in consumer education and complaints advisory work.

History 
The Consumers’ Council was established in 1959 ‘to protect and promote the interest of consumers of goods and services’. In 1963 the name Consumers Institute was adopted and in 1967 it became a separate government-funded entity. In 1986 the Ministry of Consumer Affairs was established and the Consumers Institute lost its special legal protection and government funding. The Consumers Institute became an incorporated society funded by members’ subscriptions in 1989 and in 2007 the Consumers’ Institute was renamed Consumer NZ. 

In 2016 the organisation had over 100,000 members and supporters.

The Minister of Consumer Affairs (New Zealand) has cited Consumer NZ as a source of guidance for consumers wanting to understand the Consumer Guarantees Act. 
With the Ministry of Consumer Affairs (New Zealand), Consumer NZ manages Powerswitch, which is a project to assist consumers in evaluating the costs of consuming electricity.

Testing 
Consumer commissions independent laboratories to carry out product tests. Their membership of Consumers International means they benefit from an exchange of information with consumer organisations around the world.

The organization does not permit any marketer to use its test results to promote their products.

The organization has been criticized for emphasizing shortcomings in nursing homes, with health care workers saying that Consumers NZ demands more from health care services than it is reasonable to expect.

The Board 
Consumer NZ is governed by an elected board of seven members who hold office for three years. The current chair is Richard Aston. The deputy chair is Sue Kedgley. As part of Consumers’ work on behalf of all NZ consumers, they regularly make submissions to Government and statutory authorities on a wide range of issues affecting consumers.

Consumers' money comes from the sale of publications and subscriptions to Consumer and consumer.org.nz. When a customer subscribes to Consumer magazine or consumer.org.nz they become a member of Consumer NZ (unless they request otherwise) and have the right to nominate and vote for Board members. The style of the magazine has been critiqued and described as a "distinctive authorial" presentation.

References

External links
 Official website

Consumer organisations in New Zealand
Members of Consumers International
Consumer rights organizations